Tamil Nadu Police is the primary law enforcement agency of the state of Tamil Nadu, India. It is over 150 years old and is the fifth largest state police force in India. Tamil Nadu has a police-population ratio of 1:632.
The Director General of the Tamil Nadu police is C. Sylendra Babu.

Organization 

For administrative purposes, the state has been divided into four police zones – North, South, West and Central each headed by an Inspector General of Police.

Inspector-general of police will be assisted by a Deputy Inspector-General Of Police with jurisdiction of range comprising 2 or more districts.

Each district is headed by a Superintendent of Police, whereas major metropolitan cities such as Chennai and it's satellite commissionerates in Tambaram and Avadi are headed by the Commissioner of Police equivalent to the rank of Additional Director General of Police and Madurai, Tiruchirappalli, Salem, Tiruppur, Tirunelveli, Coimbatore are headed by a City Commissioner Of Police equivalent to the rank of Inspector-General of Police.

North Zone 
North Zone having jurisdiction over 10 Districts (excluding Chennai City, Avadi City, Tambaram City) viz., Kanchipuram, Thiruvallur, Villuppuram, Cuddalore, Vellore,
Ranipet,
Thirupattur,  Tiruvannamalai, Kallakurichi, Chengalpattu.The Inspector General of Police in the North Zone is N. Kannan IPS

West Zone 

West Zone having jurisdiction over 8 Districts (exclude Coimbatore City, Salem City, Tiruppur City) viz., Coimbatore Rural, Tiruppur Rural, Salem Rural, The Nilgiris, Erode, Dharmapuri, Krishnagiri and Namakkal. The Inspector General of Police in the West Zone is R. Sudhakar IPS

Central Zone 

Central Zone having jurisdiction over 9 Districts (excluding Tiruchirappalli City) viz., Thanjavur, Tiruchirappalli Rural, Perambalur, Ariyalur, Karur, Nagapattinam, Tiruvarur, Pudukottai and Mayiladuthurai. The Inspector General of Police in the Central Zone is G. Karthikeyan IPS

South Zone 

South Zone having jurisdiction over 10 Districts (excluding Madurai City and Tirunelveli City) viz., Madurai Rural, Dindigul, Ramanathapuram, Sivagangai, Theni, Virudhunagar, Tuticorin, Tirunelveli Rural, Kanyakumari and Tenkasi.
The Inspector General of Police in the South Zone is Asra Garg IPS

Role and duties 

 The zonal inspector general of police will be responsible for all the police functions, including maintenance of law and order, crime control, internal security, civil defense, enforcement of all legislations, including special laws empowering police force and various other public services insofar as his zone is concerned. He is also accountable for modernisation of police force, and proposals should be routed through him as far as his zone is concerned.
 He is link in the chain of command between the Director General of Police and Range Deputy Inspector General of Police/District Superintendent of Police in his jurisdictions.
 He should endeavour by frequent personal inspections to establish and maintain efficiency and discipline, to ensure uniformity of procedure and practice and to secure cooperation between the police of his ranges/districts as well as harmonious working between the police, revenue and the judiciary.
 The Zonal Inspector General of Police will control, instruct and advise the range Deputy Inspectors General of Police/Commissioners of Police/Superintendents of Police while being careful not to supersede them in any of their proper functions or relations to their subordinates. He will not assume the role of Deputy Inspectors General of police/Superintendents of Police in times of grave disorder, taking over full control of the situation. He will pay particular attention to the training of and the discipline in the Armed Reserve and also supervise the functioning of AWPS in his Zone, so that the highest possible standard of efficiency may be reached and maintained.
 The Zonal Inspector General of Police will conduct inspection of the districts units once in two years and inspection of range units once in a year, besides taking up of 1/7th of police stations, circle officers and sub divisions. The Zonal Inspector General of Police should avoid inspection wherever it is programmed to be inspected by the Range Deputy Inspectors of Police concerned in the particular year. The Zonal Inspector General of Police will send a copy of the inspection notes to the Director General of Police through Additional Director General of Police (Law & Order). The Zonal Inspector General of Police must also review the inspection notes of the Deputy Inspectors General of police/Superintendents of Police.
 Copies of all weekly reports of Superintendents of Police/ Deputy Inspectors General of Police/ should be marked to the concerned zonal Inspector General of Police who shall review and send it up with his remarks.
 Fortnightly reports of Superintendents of Police/ Deputy Inspectors General of Police should be routed through the concerned zonal Inspector General of Police who shall review and send it up with his remarks wherever action is warranted.
 He shall conduct periodic reviews on all the aspects mentioned under par 3(i) above along with review of performance of Deputy Inspectors General of police and Superintendents of Police in his jurisdiction. A monthly consolidated report reflecting the happenings in the zone should be sent by him to the Government through the Director General of Police not later than 7th day of the succeeding month and it shall reach the Government before the 15th day of the succeeding month with the remarks of the Director General of Police. A reporting format will be evolved and standardized by the Director General of Police under information to the Government.
 He will have powers of review over all the special units in his zone whose performance appraisal also has to be incorporated in the monthly performance review report prescribed above.

Ranks of law enforcement in Tamil Nadu 
The ranks, posts and designations of all police officers vary from state to state as law and order is a state matter. But, generally the following pattern is observed:

Gazetted Officers
.

Non-gazetted officers

Administrative Powers 

 Transfer of personnel up to the rank of Inspector of Police within the zone. All inter Range transfers of personnel up to the rank of Inspector of Police including Inspector of Police (Armed Reserve) within the Zone will be decided by the Zonal Inspector General of Police. The Zonal Inspector General of Police will issue orders of transfers to Ranges/City in respect of Inspectors/ Sub-Inspector of Police and to the Districts/Cities in respect of constabulary within his zone. The concerned appointing authorities viz the Deputy Inspectors General of Police/Commissioners of Police in respect of Inspectors of Police/Sub Inspectors of Police and the Superintendent of Police/Deputy Commissioner of Police in respect of constabulary will issue necessary transfer and posting orders. All norms relating to transfers and postings prescribed in the Rules and Guidelines issued by the Government/Director General of Police should be followed. It should be ensured that the officer gets a chance to serve in different wings of the Department particularly the ones which are essential for promotion. It should be ensured that no one is transferred before completion of his tenure in the present station (except on adverse grounds). At the same time no one should be allowed to continue in the same police station after completion of 2 years in violation of G.O.Ms.No.661, Home (Police-I) Dept., dated.13.05.91. Those who have completed 2 years (or) will be completing 2 years on 1 April should be transferred out. In the case of pre-mature transfers on extra ordinary circumstances, Director General of Police shall be addressed explaining the necessity for orders and ratification obtained.
 Sanction of Casual Leave/Holiday Permission / Permission to leave Headquarters:   The power of sanctioning Casual Leave/Holiday Permission/ Permission to leave headquarters to the district Superintendents of Police/Deputy Commissioners of Police, Range Deputy Inspectors General of Police and Commissioner of Police, hitherto exercised by the Director General of Police be now delegated to the Zonal Inspector General of Police.
 Sanction of MSEs up to the level of the Inspectors of Police. Now, this power has been vested with ADGP., (L&O), Chennai-04.

Budget 
 (2020-21 est.)

Equipment 

Majority of the equipment used by Tamil Nadu police are manufactured by Indian Ordnance Factories controlled by the Ordnance Factories Board, Ministry of Defence, and the Government of India. Tamil Nadu police are equipped with various weapons such as AK-47, Ishapore 2A1 rifle, Lee–Enfield rifle, INSAS rifle, FN FAL rifle, Glock handguns, shotguns and grenade launchers.

Special Units 
The special units of Tamil Nadu Police headed by Additional Director General of Police/Inspector general of police which is also supervised overall by Director General of Police. These Special Units perform specific functions related to security, intelligence, criminal investigations and support services. They are as follows:
 Armed Police or Tamil Nadu Special Police
 Civil Defence and Home Guards
 Civil Supplies, CID
 Coastal Security Group (CSG)
 Crime Branch, CID
 Crime Against Women and Children-Special Wing 
 Economic Offences Wing (EOW)
 Intelligence 
 Operations – TN Commando Force & Commando School
 Prohibition Enforcement Wing
 Railway Police
 Social Justice and Human Rights 
 Special Branch, CID including Security
 State Crime Record Bureau 
 Technical Services
 TNEB Vigilance 
 Tamil Nadu State Transport Corporation  Vigilance 
 Traffic Planning and Road Safety Cell
 Special Task Force (STF)
 Directorate Vigilance and Anti-Corruption

Cyber Crime Wing   
Routine cyber offences including phishing, vishing, morphing, extortion and cyber stalking complainants from individuals are investigated by the cyber crime police stations in districts and cities. The Cyber crime wing is headed by the Additional Director General of Police, Cyber Crime. 

The Cyber Crime Investigation Centre located at the hear quarter of Cyber Crime Wing of Tamil Nadu police in Ashok Nagar, Chennai, deals exclusively with organised cyber crime, ransomware attacks and cryptocurrency frauds . The Cyber Crime Investigation Centre was notified as a police station with wider power and jurisdiction across the state. It investigates cases with undefined jurisdiction of suspects and complainants. It also investigates social media posts that abuse constitutional functionaries, damage state integrity, disturbs public order, anti-national activities, media that affect the sovereignty and integrity of India.

Social Media Monitoring Centre, in 2022, the Tamil Nadu Government announced its formation "to monitor and curb the spread of fake news and misinformation online".

Helpline
The Cyber crime helpline phone number is 1930. Victims of any cyber financial fraud can contact the helpline to block and revert the money transferred to criminals.

Photo gallery

See also 
 Operation Puttur
 Operation Bawaria
 Operation Cocoon
 Law enforcement in India

Notes

References

External links 

 Official website of Tamil Nadu Police
 Tamil Nadu Police Constable Exam Result
 Police Jobs in Tamilnadu

State law enforcement agencies of India
Tamil Nadu Police
19th-century establishments in India